Word guessing refers to a method of reading in which a beginner reader doesn't know what a word is in a sentence, so they guess what the word is and read the rest of the sentence to confirm their guess.

Example
In the sentence, "The fox jumped over the dog.", if the reader isn't familiar with the word "jumped", then they might read it as "joom-ped". After reading the rest of the sentence, they may realize that the word was actually was.

References

Reading (process)